William Greenfield was Lord Chancellor of England and Archbishop of York.

William Greenfield may also refer to:

William Greenfield (minister) (died 1827), Scottish minister, literary critic, author and mathematician
William Greenfield (philologist) (1799–1831), English philologist
William Smith Greenfield (1846–1919), British anatomist